Marnie Holborow is an  author and Associate Faculty  at Dublin City University. She is the author of two books on Marxism and language, the most recent being Language and Neoliberalism (Routledge 2015). She writes on language and politics, language and the neoliberal marketisation of higher education. More recently, she has written journal articles on the home, women and paid employment and specifically on the 2018 movement in Ireland for abortion rights, in which she was a leading activist. She lives in Dublin, Ireland. She is a member of the political party People before Profit and of the Socialist Workers Network.

Published works
Books by Marnie Holborow include:
Marnie Holborow. The Politics of English, Sage Publications, 1999.
David Block, John Gray and Marnie Holborow. Neoliberalism and Applied Linguistics, Routledge, 2012.
 Marnie Holborow. 'Language and Neoliberalism', Routledge, 2015

References

External links 

Academics of Dublin City University
Living people
Year of birth missing (living people)